Nain Airstrip  is an airstrip serving the town of Nain and the Alpart alumina refinery in the Saint Elizabeth Parish of Jamaica.

There is distant high terrain east of the airstrip.

See also

Transport in Jamaica
List of airports in Jamaica

References

External links
OpenStreetMap - Nain
Bing Maps - Nain Airstrip

Airports in Jamaica